Elena Salvador Reja (born 15 May 1979) is a Spanish former professional tennis player.

Born in Madrid, Salvador was a right-handed player who reached a career best singles ranking of 210 in the world.

Salvador made all of her WTA Tour main draw appearances in her home tournament, the Madrid Open. She received a wildcard for the singles at the 1997 Madrid Open and played doubles in three further editions.

ITF finals

Singles: 4 (2–2)

Doubles: 3 (2–1)

References

External links

1979 births
Living people
Spanish female tennis players
Tennis players from Madrid